"Kholstomer", also translated as "Strider", is a work by Leo Tolstoy that has been referred to as “one of the most striking stories in Russian literature”. It was started in 1863 and left unfinished until 1886, when it was reworked and published as "Kholstomer: The Story of a Horse". Georgi Tovstonogov staged it in his theatre in 1975. The horse was played by Evgeny Lebedev. This story prominently features the technique of defamiliarization by adopting the perspective of a horse to expose some of the irrationalities of human conventions.

Strider's altruistic life is recounted parallel to that of his selfish and useless owner. At the end of the story Strider dies but his corpse gives birth to a new life - that of wolf cubs:

See also

Leo Tolstoy bibliography
List of fictional horses

References

External links 

 English Text
 Kholstomer, from RevoltLib.com
 Kholstomer, from Marxists.org
 Kholstomer, from TheAnarchistLibrary.org
 Commentaries
 Analysis of Kholstomer: The Story of a Horse on Lit React

1886 books
Short stories by Leo Tolstoy
Fictional horses